Tonga has competed in eight editions of the Olympic Summer Games and two of the Olympic Winter Games. It became the smallest independent nation to win an Olympic medal in the Summer games when Super Heavyweight Boxer Paea Wolfgramm earned silver in the 1996 Super heavyweight 91 kg championships in Atlanta.

Tonga sought to enter a delegation for the 2010 Winter Olympics, which would have been the country's first participation in the Winter Games. The Tonga Amateur Sports Association (TASA) announced that it intended to send one athlete to compete in the luge event. In December 2008, two male athletes (Fuahea Semi and Taniela Tufunga) were selected to travel to Germany for training, although only one of them would compete at the Olympics. Semi was eventually selected as Tonga's candidate to compete in the Games, and was presented by his German sponsors under a new name, "Bruno Banani". He failed to qualify, however, crashing in the final round of qualifications and ending the Kingdom's hopes of competing at the 2010 Games. Banani qualified for the 2014 Winter Olympic Games in Sochi, Russia, becoming the first Tongan athlete to compete at the Winter Games.

Medal tables

Medals by Summer Games

Medals by Winter Games

Medals by sport

List of medalists

See also
 List of flag bearers for Tonga at the Olympics
 Tonga at the Paralympics
 Tropical nations at the Winter Olympics

References

External links
 
 
 

 
Olympics